Radovan Pankov (born 5 August 1995) is a Serbian professional footballer who plays as a defender for Serbian club Čukarički on loan from Red Star Belgrade.

Club career

Vojvodina
As a youth player, Pankov developed under the supervision of Vojvodina youth coach Milan Kosanović. He was a member of one of the most talented generations in Vojvodina's youth ranks, as his teammates at the time included Sergej Milinković-Savić, Mijat Gaćinović, Srđan Babić, Nebojša Kosović, Emil Rockov, and Milan Spremo. He emphasized that Spremo was "by far the greatest talent of that generation".

Pankov made his professional debut for Vojvodina on 10 May 2014 in 1-0 home loss to Jagodina. In the summer of 2015, Pankov participated in Vojvodina's 2015–16 UEFA Europa League qualifying campaign. On 30 July 2015, he played in a historic 0-4 away win against Sampdoria in the first leg of the third qualifying round for the Europa League. In an interview with Mozzart Sport in August 2019, Pankov claimed that the best striker he ever played against was Luis Muriel from the 2015 Europa League duel with Sampdoria. The first leg win against Sampdoria ultimately helped Vojvodina make the play-off against Viktoria Plzeň, after which Vojvodina was eliminated.

Ural Sverdlovskaya Oblast
On 23 May 2016, Pankov signed a long-term contract with Russian side Ural Sverdlovskaya Oblast. He was the second player from Vojvodina to join Ural that spring, after Dominik Dinga. Shortly after joining Ural, he suffered an adductor injury.

On 30 June 2017, Pankov signed a one-season loan deal with Cypriot side AEK Larnaca.

Radnički Niš
On 20 June 2018, Pankov signed a three-year contract with Serbian club Radnički Niš. He played as a starter under coach Nenad Lalatović, and Radnički Niš went on to finish second overall in the 2018–19 Serbian SuperLiga. He was named by Zajednica Super lige among the best eleven players in the entire league that season.

Red Star Belgrade
On 31 May 2019, Pankov signed a three-year contract with Red Star Belgrade. On 13 August 2019, he played a memorable match in the second leg of the third qualifying round of the 2019–20 UEFA Champions League against Copenhagen. He marked Dame N'Doye throughout the match and scored the winning penalty in a penalty shoot-out after overtime.

International career
Pankov was selected by coach Veljko Paunović to Serbia's squad for the 2015 FIFA U-20 World Cup, which Serbia ended up winning.

Personal life
Pankov's mother hailed from Herzegovina. His father, Miloš Pankov, was originally from Tovariševo and played as a playmaker for Proleter Zrenjanin in Yugoslavia's third tier. At one point he was a teammate with Darko Kovačević. He was killed in a car accident when Pankov was 11 years old.

Honours

Club
AEK Larnaca
 Cypriot Cup: 2017–18

Red Star Belgrade
 Serbian SuperLiga (3): 2019–20, 2020–21, 2021–22
 Serbian Cup (2): 2020–21, 2021–22

International
Serbia
 FIFA U-20 World Cup: 2015

Individual
Serbian SuperLiga Team of the Season (1): 2018–19

References

External links
 Radovan Pankov Stats at utakmica.rs
 

 

1995 births
Living people
Footballers from Novi Sad
Association football defenders
Serbian footballers
Serbia youth international footballers
FK Vojvodina players
Serbian SuperLiga players
Serbian expatriate footballers
Expatriate footballers in Russia
Expatriate footballers in Cyprus
FC Ural Yekaterinburg players
Russian Premier League players
AEK Larnaca FC players
Cypriot First Division players
FK Radnički Niš players
Serbia under-21 international footballers